Kirill Sidorenko may refer to:
Kirill Sidorenko (born 1983), Russian ice hockey player
Kyrylo Sydorenko (born 1985), Ukrainian footballer
Kiryl Sidarenka (born 1995), Belarusian footballer